Sinhalese people are an Indo-Aryan ethno-linguistic group native to the island of Sri Lanka. They were historically known as Hela people. They constitute about 75% of the Sri Lankan population and number more than 16.2 million. The Sinhalese identity is based on language, cultural heritage and nationality. The Sinhalese people speak Sinhala, an insular Indo-Aryan language, and are predominantly Theravada Buddhists, although a minority of Sinhalese follow branches of Christianity and 
other religions. Since 1815, they were broadly divided into two respective groups: The 'Up-country Sinhalese' in the central mountainous regions, and the 'Low-country Sinhalese' in the coastal regions; although both groups speak the same language, they are distinguished as they observe different cultural customs.

According to the Mahavamsa and the Dipavamsa, a third–fifth century treatise written in Pali by Buddhist monks of the Anuradhapura Maha Viharaya in Sri Lanka, the Sinhalese descend from settlers who came to the island in 543 BCE from Sinhapura led by Prince Vijaya who mixed with the indigenous Yakka and later settlers from the Pandya kingdom.

Etymology
Sinhala is derived from Sanskrit siṃhá, literally "lion", with the suffix -la, together meaning "abode of lions", referring to the prevalence of lions in earlier Sri Lankan history.

The Mahavamsa records the origin of the Sinhalese people and related historical events. It traces the historical origin of the Sinhalese people back to the first king mentioned in the documentary history of Sri Lanka, Vijaya, who was the son of Sinhabahu (Sanskrit meaning 'Sinha' (lion) + 'bahu' (hands, feet)), the ruler of Sinhapura. Some versions suggest Vijaya is the grandson of Sinhabahu. According to the Mahavamsa, Sinhabahu was the son of princess Suppadevi of Vanga, who copulated with a lion and gave birth to a daughter called Sinhasivali and to a son, Sinhabahu, whose hands and feet were like the paws of a lion and who had the strength of a lion. King Vijaya, of the lineage of Sinhabahu, according to the Mahavamsa and other historical sources, arrived on the island of Tambapanni (Sri Lanka) and gave origin to the lion people, the Sinhalese.

The story of the arrival of Prince Vijaya in Sri Lanka and the origin of the Sinhalese people is also depicted in the Ajanta caves, in a mural of cave number 17.

History

The early recorded history of the Sinhalese is chronicled in two documents, the Mahavamsa, written in Pāli around the fourth century CE, and the later Culavamsa (the first segment probably penned in the 13th century CE by the Buddhist monk Dhammakitti). These are ancient sources that cover the histories of the powerful ancient Sinhalese kingdoms of Anuradhapura and Polonnaruwa which lasted for 1500 years. The Mahavamsa describes the existence of fields of rice and reservoirs, indicating a well-developed agrarian society.

Pre-Anuradhapura period

According to the Mahavamsa, Prince Vijaya and his 700 followers left Suppāraka, landed on the island at a site believed by historians to be in the district of Puttalam, south of modern-day Mannar, and founded the Kingdom of Tambapanni. It is recorded that Vijaya made his landing on the day of Buddha's Parinirvana. Vijaya claimed Tambapanni as his capital and soon the whole island went under this name. Tambapanni was originally inhabited and governed by Yakkhas, having their capital at Sirīsavatthu and their queen Kuveni. According to the Samyutta Commentary, Tambapanni was one hundred leagues in extent.

At the end of his reign, Vijaya, having trouble choosing a successor, sent a letter to the city of his ancestors, Sinhapura, in order to invite his brother Sumitta to take over the throne. However, Vijaya had died before the letter had reached its destination, so the elected minister of the people Upatissa, the Chief government minister and leading chief among the Sinhalese became regent and acted as regent for a year. After his coronation (in 505 BC), which was held in Tambapanni, he left it, building another city Upatissa Nuwara, named after himself,  further north of Tambapanni. When Vijaya's letter finally arrived, Sumitta had already succeeded his father as king of his country, and so he sent his son Panduvasdeva to rule Upatissa Nuwara.

Anuradhapura period

In 377 BC, King Pandukabhaya (437–367 BC) moved the capital to Anuradhapura and developed it into a prosperous city. Anuradhapura (Anurapura) was named after the minister who first established the village and after a grandfather of Pandukabhaya who lived there. The name was also derived from the city's establishment on the auspicious asterism called Anura. Anuradhapura was the capital of all the monarchs who ruled from the dynasty.

Rulers such as Dutthagamani, Valagamba, and Dhatusena are noted for defeating the South Indians and regaining control of the kingdom. Other rulers who are notable for military achievements include Gajabahu I, who launched an invasion against the invaders, and Sena II, who sent his armies to assist a Pandyan prince.

Polonnaruwa period

During the Middle Ages Sri Lanka was well known for its agricultural prosperity under king Parakramabahu in Polonnaruwa during which period the island was famous around the world as the rice mill of the east.

Transitional period

Later in the 13th century the country's administrative provinces were divided into independent kingdoms and chieftaincies: Kingdom of Sitawaka, Kingdom of Kotte, Jaffna Kingdom and the Kandyan kingdom. The invasion by the Hindu king Magha in the 13th century led to migrations by the Buddhists (mostly Sinhalese) to areas not under his control. This migration was followed by a period of conflict among the Sinhalese chiefs who tried to exert political supremacy. Parakramabahu VI, a Sinhalese king invaded the Jaffna Kingdom and conquered it, bringing the entire country back under the Sinhalese kingdom for 17 years. Trade also increased during this period, as Sri Lanka began to trade cinnamon and a large number of Muslim traders were bought into the island.

In the 15th century a Kandyan Kingdom formed which divided the Sinhalese politically into low-country and up-country. In this period, the Sinhalese caste structure absorbed recent Dravidian Hindu immigrants from South India leading to the emergence of three new Sinhalese caste groups - the Salagama, the Durava and the Karava.

Modern history

The Sinhalese have a stable birth rate and a population that has been growing at a slow pace relative to India and other Asian countries.

Society

Demographics

Sri Lanka

Within Sri Lanka the majority of the Sinhalese reside in the South, Central, Sabaragamuwa and Western parts of the country. This coincides with the largest Sinhalese populations areas in Sri Lanka. Cities with more than 90% Sinhalese population include Hambantota, Galle, Gampaha, Kurunegala, Monaragala, Anuradhapura and Polonnaruwa.

Diaspora

Sinhalese people have emigrated out to many countries for a variety of reasons. The larger diaspora communities are situated in the United Kingdom, Australia, United States and Canada among others. In addition to this there are many Sinhalese, who reside in the Middle East, Southeast Asia and Europe, temporarily in connection with employment and/or education. They are often employed as guest workers in the Middle East and professionals in the other regions.

The largest population centres of the Sinhalese diaspora are mainly situated in Europe, North America and Australia. The city of Melbourne contains just under half of the Sri Lankan Australians. The 2011 census recorded 86,412 Sri Lanka born in Australia. There are 73,849 Australians (0.4 of the population) who reported having Sinhalese ancestry in 2006. Sinhala was also reported to be the 29th-fastest-growing language in Australia (ranking above Somali but behind Hindi and Belarusian). Sinhalese Australians have an exceptionally low rate of return migration to Sri Lanka. In the 2011 Canadian Census, 7,220 people identified themselves as of Sinhalese ancestry, out of 139,415 Sri Lankans. There are a small number of Sinhalese people in India, scattered around the country, but mainly living in and around the northern and southern regions. Sri Lankan New Zealanders comprised 3% of the Asian population of New Zealand in 2001. The numbers arriving continued to increase, and at the 2018 census there were over 16,000 Sri Lankans living in New Zealand among those 9,171 were Sinhalese.

In the U.S., the Sinhalese number about 12,000 people. The New York City Metropolitan Area contains the largest Sri Lankan community in the United States, receiving the highest legal permanent resident Sri Lankan immigrant population, followed by Central New Jersey and the Los Angeles metropolitan area. Many Sinhalese have migrated to Italy since the 1970s. Italy was attractive to the Sinhalese due to perceived easier employment opportunities and entry, compared to other European countries. It is estimated that there are 30,000-33,000 Sinhalese in Italy. The major Sinhalese communities in Italy are located in Lombardia (In the districts Loreto and Lazzaretto), Milan, Lazio, Rome, Naples, and Southern Italy (Particularly Palermo, Messina and Catania). Many countries census list Sri Lankan, which also includes Sri Lankan Tamils, so the numbers of just Sinhalese are not as accurate when the census states Sri Lankan and not Sinhalese. Though Sinhalese people in particular and Sri Lankans in general have migrated to the UK over the centuries beginning from the colonial times, the number of Sinhalese people in the UK cannot be estimated accurately due to inadequacies of census in the UK. The UK government does not record statistics on the basis of language or ethnicity and all Sri Lankans are classified into one group as Asian British or Asian Other.

Language and literature

Sinhalese people speak Sinhala, also known as "Helabasa"; this language has two varieties, spoken and written. Sinhala is an Indo-Aryan language within the broader group of Indo-European languages. The early form of the language was brought to Sri Lanka by the ancestors of the Sinhalese people from northern India who settled on the island in the sixth century BCE. Sinhala developed in a way different from the other Indo-Aryan languages because of the geographic separation from its Indo-Aryan sister languages. It was influenced by many languages, prominently Pali, the sacred language of Southern Buddhism, Telugu and Sanskrit. Many early texts in the language such as the Hela Atuwa were lost after their translation into Pali. Other significant Sinhala texts include Amāvatura, Kavu Silumina, Jathaka Potha and Sala Liheeniya. Sinhala has also adopted many loanwords of foreign origin, including from many Indian such as Tamil and European languages such as Portuguese, Dutch, and English.

Sandesha Kavyas written by Buddhist priests of Sri Lanka are regarded as some of the most sophisticated and versatile works of literature in the world. The Sinhala language was mainly inspired by Sanskrit and Pali, and many words of the Sinhala language derive from these languages. Today some English words too have come in as a result of the British occupation during colonial times, and the exposure to foreign cultures through television and foreign films. Additionally many Dutch and Portuguese words can be seen in the coastal areas. Sinhalese people, depending on where they live in Sri Lanka, may also additionally speak English and or Tamil. According to the 2012 Census 23.8% or 3,033,659 Sinhalese people also spoke English and 6.4% or 812,738 Sinhalese people also spoke Tamil. In the Negombo area bilingual fishermen who generally identify themselves as Sinhalese also speak the Negombo Tamil dialect. This dialect has undergone considerable convergence with spoken Sinhala.

Folk tales like Mahadana Muttha saha Golayo and Kawate Andare continue to entertain children today. Mahadana Muttha tells the tale of a fool cum Pundit who travels around the country with his followers (Golayo) creating mischief through his ignorance. Kawate Andare tells the tale of a witty court jester and his interactions with the royal court and his son.

In the modern period, Sinhala writers such as Martin Wickremasinghe and G. B. Senanayake have drawn widespread acclaim. Other writers of repute include Mahagama Sekera and Madewela S. Ratnayake. Martin Wickramasinghe wrote the immensely popular children's novel Madol Duwa. Munadasa Cumaratunga's Hath Pana is also widely known.

Religion

The form of Buddhism in Sri Lanka is known as Theravada (school of elders). The Pali chronicles (e.g., the Mahavansa) claim that the Sinhalese as an ethnic group are destined to preserve and protect Buddhism. In 1988 almost 93% of the Sinhala speaking population in Sri Lanka were Buddhist. Observations of current religious beliefs and practices demonstrate that the Sinhalese, as a religious community, have a complex worldview as Buddhists. Due to the proximity and on some occasions similarity of certain doctrines, there are many areas where Buddhists and Hindus share religious views and practices. Sinhalese Buddhists have adopted religious elements from Hindu traditions in their religious practices. Some of these practices may relate to ancient indigenous beliefs and traditions on spirits (folk religion), and the worship of Hindu deities. Some of these figures are used in healing rituals and may be native to the island. Gods and goddess derived from Hindu deities are worshiped by Sinhalese. Kataragama Deviyo from Kartikeya, Upulvan from Vishnu and Ayyanayake from Aiyanar can be named as examples. Though these gods take the same place as their Hindu counterparts in mythology, some of their aspects are different compared to the original gods.

Prominent Sri Lankan anthropologists Gananath Obeyesekere and Kitsiri Malalgoda used the term "Protestant Buddhism" to describe a type of Buddhism that appeared among the Sinhalese in Sri Lanka as a response to Protestant Christian missionaries and their evangelical activities during the British colonial period. This kind of Buddhism involved emulating the Protestant strategies of organising religious practices. They saw the need to establish Buddhist schools for educating Buddhist youth and organising Buddhists with new organisations such as the Young Men's Buddhist Association, as well as printing pamphlets to encourage people to participate in debates and religious controversies to defend Buddhism.

Christianity
There is a significant Sinhalese Christian community, in the maritime provinces of Sri Lanka. Christianity was brought to the Sinhalese by Portuguese, Dutch, and British missionary groups during their respective periods of rule. Most Sinhalese Christians are Roman Catholic; a minority are Protestant. Their cultural centre is Negombo.

Religion is considered very important among the Sinhalese. According to a 2008 Gallup poll, 99% of Sri Lankans considered religion an important aspect of their daily lives.

Genetics

Modern studies point towards a predominantly Bengali contribution and a minor Tamil influence. Gujarati and Punjabi lineages are also visible. In relation to the former, other studies also show the Sinhalese possess some genetic admixture from Southeast Asian populations, especially from Austroasiatic groups. Certain Y-DNA and mtDNA haplogroups and genetic markers of immunoglobulin among the Sinhalese, for example, show Southeast Asian genetic influences many of which are also found among certain Northeast Indian populations to whom the Sinhalese are genetically related.

Culture

Sinhalese culture is a unique one dating as far back as 2600 years and has been nourished by Theravada Buddhism. Its main domains are sculpture, fine arts, literature, dancing, poetry and a wide variety of folk beliefs and rituals traditionally. Ancient Sinhala stone sculpture and inscriptions are known worldwide and is a main foreign attraction in modern tourism. Sigirirya is famous for its frescoes. Folk poems were sung by workers to accompany their work and narrate the story of their lives. Ideally these poems consisted of four lines and, in the composition of these poems, special attention had been paid to the rhyming patterns. Buddhist festivals are dotted by unique music using traditionally Sinhalese instruments. More ancient rituals like  (devil exorcism) continue to enthrall audiences today and often praised and invoked the good powers of the Buddha and the gods in order to exorcise the demons.

Folklore and national mythology
According to the Mahavamsa, the Sinhalese are descended from the exiled Prince Vijaya and his party of seven hundred followers who arrived on the island in 543 BCE. Vijaya and his followers were said to have arrived in Sri Lanka after being exiled from the city of Sinhapura in Bengal. The modern Sinhalese people were found genetically to be most closely related to the people of North-East India (Bengal). It is thought throughout Sri Lanka's history, since the founding of the Sinhalese in the fifth century BC that an influx of Indians from North India came to the island. This is further supported from Sinhala being part of the Indo-Aryan language group.

Traditionally during recreation the Sinhalese wear a sarong (sarama in Sinhala). Men may wear a long-sleeved shirt with a sarong. Clothing varies by region for women. Low country Sinhalese women wear a white Long sleeved jacket, and a tight wrap around skirt, which usually is embedded with a floral or pattern design. As for the up country Sinhalese, women wear a similar outfit, but with a puffed up shoulder jacket, and a tucked in frill that lines the top of the skirt (Reda and Hatte in Sinhala). Traditionally, high caste Kandyan women wear a Kandyan style sari, which is similar to the Maharashtrian sari, with the drape but with a frill lining the bottom half and sometimes puffed up sleeves. It is also called an Osariya. The low country high caste women wear a South Indian style saree. Within the more populated areas, Sinhalese men also wear Western-style clothing — wearing suits while the women wear skirts and blouses. For formal and ceremonial occasions women wear the traditional Kandyan (Osariya) style, which consists of a full blouse which covers the midriff completely, and is partially tucked in at the front. However, modern intermingling of styles has led to most wearers baring the midriff. The Kandyan style is considered as the national dress of Sinhalese women. In many occasions and functions, even the saree plays an important role in women's clothing and has become the de facto clothing for female office workers especially in government sector. An example of its use is the uniform of air hostesses of Sri Lankan Airlines.

Cuisine

Sinhalese cuisine is one of the most complex cuisines of South Asia. As a major trade hub, it draws influence from colonial powers that were involved in Sri Lanka and by foreign traders. Rice, which is consumed daily, can be found at any occasion, while spicy curries are favourite dishes for lunch and dinner. Some of the Sri Lankan dishes have striking resemblance to Kerala cuisine, which could be due to the similar geographic and agricultural features with Kerala. A well-known rice dish with Sinhalese is Kiribath, meaning ‘milk rice’. Coconut milk is found in most Sri Lankan dishes to give the cuisine its unique flavour.

Sri Lanka has long been renowned for its spices. The best known is cinnamon which is native to Sri Lanka. In the 15th and 16th centuries, spice and ivory traders from all over the world who came to Sri Lanka brought their native cuisines to the island, resulting in a rich diversity of cooking styles and techniques. Lamprais, rice boiled in stock with a special curry, accompanied by frikkadels (meatballs), all of which is then wrapped in a banana leaf and baked as a Dutch-influenced Sri Lankan dish. Dutch and Portuguese sweets also continue to be popular. British influences include roast beef and roast chicken. Also, the influence of the Indian cooking methods and food have played a major role in what Sri Lankans eat.

The island nation's cuisine mainly consists of boiled or steamed rice served with curry. This usually consists of a main curry of fish or chicken, as well as several other curries made with vegetables, lentils and even fruit curries. The most famous of these is the coconut sambol, made of ground coconut mixed with chili peppers, dried Maldive fish and lime juice. This is ground to a paste and eaten with rice, as it gives zest to the meal and is believed to increase appetite.

Art and architecture

Many forms of Sri Lankan arts and crafts take inspiration from the island's long and lasting Buddhist culture which in turn has absorbed and adopted countless regional and local traditions. In most instances Sri Lankan art originates from religious beliefs, and is represented in many forms such as painting, sculpture, and architecture. One of the most notable aspects of Sri Lankan art are caves and temple paintings, such as the frescoes found at Sigiriya, and religious paintings found in temples in Dambulla and Temple of the Tooth Relic in Kandy. Other popular forms of art have been influenced by both natives as well as outside settlers. For example, traditional wooden handicrafts and clay pottery are found around the hill country while Portuguese-inspired lacework and Indonesian-inspired Batik have become notable. It has many different and beautiful drawings.

Developed upon Indo-Aryan architectural skills in the late sixth century BCE Sinhalese people who lived upon greater kingdoms such as Anuradhapura and Polonnaruwa have built so many architectural examples such as Ruwanwelisaya, Jetavanaramaya - second tallest brick building in the ancient world after Great Pyramid of Giza, and Abayagiriya - third tallest brick building in the ancient world. And also with the ancient hydraulic technology which is also unique to Sinhalese people to build ancient tanks, systematic ponds with fountains moats and Irrigational reservoirs such as Parakrama Samudra, Kaudulla and Kandalama. Sigiriya which is considered by many as the eighth wonder of the world, it is a combination of natural and man made fortress, which consists so many architectural aspects.

Music

There are extensive folk poems relating to specific jobs of the ancient society. These poems were communal songs which had a rhythm that were sung when performing day-to-day tasks like harvesting and sowing.

Concerning popular music, Ananda Samarakoon developed the reflective and poignant Sarala gee style with his work in the late 1930s/early 1940s. He has been followed by artists of repute such as Sunil Shantha, W. D. Amaradeva, Premasiri Khemadasa, Nanda Malini, Victor Ratnayake, Austin Munasinghe, T. M. Jayaratne, Sanath Nandasiri, Sunil Edirisinghe, Neela Wickremasinghe, Gunadasa Kapuge, Malini Bulathsinghala and Edward Jayakody.

Film and theatre

Dramatist Ediriweera Sarachchandra revitalised the drama form with Maname in 1956. The same year, film director Lester James Peries created the artistic masterwork Rekava which sought to create a uniquely Sinhalese cinema with artistic integrity. Since then, Peries and other directors like Vasantha Obeysekera, Dharmasena Pathiraja, Mahagama Sekera, W. A. B. de Silva, Dharmasiri Bandaranayake, Sunil Ariyaratne, Siri Gunasinghe, G. D. L. Perera, Piyasiri Gunaratne, Titus Thotawatte, D. B. Nihalsinghe, Ranjith Lal, Dayananda Gunawardena, Mudalinayake Somaratne, Asoka Handagama, and Prasanna Vithanage have developed an artistic Sinhalese cinema. Sinhala cinema is often made colourful with the incorporation of songs and dance adding more uniqueness to the industry.

In the recent years high budget films like Aloko Udapadi, Aba (film) and Maharaja Gemunu based on Sinhalese epic historical stories gain huge success.

Performing arts

Performing arts of the Sinhalese people can be categorised into few groups:

Kandyan dance consist of 18 Wannam (dance routines) featuring behaviours of various animals such as elephant, eagle, cobra, monkey, peacock and rabbit, mainly performing in the annual Perahara pageant in Sri Dalada Maligawa Kandy.
Pahatharata dance have a significant dancing style which is used to cure illnesses and spiritual clarification. The main feature of these dances is dancers wear masks representing various gods and demons, and use elements such as fire and water to bless people.
Sabaragamuwa dances have also a significant dancing style, mainly to entertain people.
Folk music and dances differ according to the casts of Sinhalese people and also some times regionally—mainly popular among small children, especially girls. These arts are widely performed during the Sinhalese New Year period.

Martial arts

Angampora is the traditional martial art of the Sinhalese people. It combines combat techniques, self-defence, sport, exercise and meditation. Key techniques observed in Angampora are: Angam, which incorporates hand-to-hand fighting, and Illangam, which uses indigenous weapons such as Velayudaya, staves, knives and swords. Its most distinct feature is the use of pressure point attacks to inflict pain or permanently paralyse the opponent. Fighters usually make use of both striking and grappling techniques, and fight until the opponent is caught in a submission lock that they cannot escape. Usage of weapons is discretionary. Perimeters of fighting are defined in advance, and in some of the cases is a pit. Angampora became nearly extinct after the country came under British rule in 1815, but survived in a few families until the country regained independence.

Science and education

The Sinhalese have a long history of literacy and formal learning. Instruction in basic fields like writing and reading by Buddhist Monks pre-date the birth of Christ. This traditional system followed religious rule and was meant to foster Buddhist understanding. Training of officials in such skills as keeping track of revenue and other records for administrative purposes occurred under this institution.

Technical education such as the building of reservoirs and canals was passed down from generation to generation through home training and outside craft apprenticeships.

The arrival of the Portuguese and Dutch and the subsequent colonisation maintained religion as the centre of education though in certain communities under Catholic and Presbyterian hierarchy. The British in the 1800s initially followed the same course. Following 1870 however they began a campaign for better education facilities in the region. Christian missionary groups were at the forefront of this development contributing to a high literacy among Christians.

By 1901 schools in the South and the North were well tended. The inner regions lagged behind however. Also, English education facilities presented hurdles for the general populace through fees and lack of access.

Medicine
Traditional Sinhalese villages in early days had at least one chief Medical personnel called Weda Mahaththaya (Doctor). These people practice their clinical activities by inheritance. Sinhalese Medicine resembles some of Ayurvedic practices in contrast for some treatments they use Buddhist Chantings (Pirith) in order to strengthen the effectiveness.

According to the Mahavamsa, the ancient chronicle, Pandukabhaya of Sri Lanka (437 BC – 367 BC) had lying-in-homes and Ayurvedic hospitals (Sivikasotthi-Sala) built in various parts of the country. This is the earliest documentary evidence we have of institutions specifically dedicated to the care of the sick anywhere in the world. Mihintale Hospital is the oldest in the world.

See also
 List of Sinhalese people
 Sinhalese Buddhist nationalism

References

Citations

Sources 

 De Silva, K. M. History of Sri Lanka (Univ. of Calif. Press, 1981)
 Gunasekera, Tamara. Hierarchy and Egalitarianism: Caste, Class, and Power in Sinhalese Peasant Society (Athlone, 1994).
 Roberts, Michael. Sri Lanka: Collective Identities Revisited (Colombo-Marga Institute, 1997).
 Wickremeratne, Ananda. Buddhism and Ethnicity in Sri Lanka: A Historical Analysis (New Delhi-Vikas Publishing House, 1995).

External links 

 CIA Factbook-Sri Lanka
 Department of Census and Statistics-Sri Lanka
 Ethnologue-Sinhala, a language of Sri Lanka
 CIA Factbook-Sri Lanka
 Sinhalese
 Who are the Sinhalese

 
Buddhist communities of Sri Lanka
Ethnic groups in Sri Lanka
Ethnic groups in the Indian Ocean
Indo-Aryan peoples
Sinhalese diaspora
Sinhalese culture